The Sillim Line is a light metro which is part of the Seoul Metropolitan Subway. It opened on May 28, 2022.

Stations

Main Line

Proposed extensions 
A northern extension towards Dongyeouido (Station name is not determined yet) is currently being considered to provide transfers to Seobu Line.

A five-station branch line from Boramae Park is also currently being considered. Citizens of Geumcheon District have lobbied for a further extension of the branch to Geumcheon-gu Office station. The proposed stations are listed below.

A two-station southern extension of the line into the Seoul National University campus was considered but ultimately cancelled.

References

Seoul Metropolitan Subway lines
Railway lines opened in 2022